Jakkapan Praisuwan (born 16 August 1994) is a Thai professional footballer who plays as a centre back for Thai League 1 club BG Pathum United and the Thailand national team.

International career
In 2022, he was called up for the 2022 AFF Championship by Head Coach Alexandré Pölking.

Honours

Club
BG Pathum United
 Thailand Champions Cup (1): 2021, 2022

International
Thailand
 AFF Championship (1): 2022

References

External links 
 Jakkapan Praisuwan's interview at Siamsport official Youtube.

1994 births
Living people
Jakkapan Praisuwan
Association football defenders
Association football midfielders
Jakkapan Praisuwan
Jakkapan Praisuwan
Jakkapan Praisuwan
Jakkapan Praisuwan
Jakkapan Praisuwan
Jakkapan Praisuwan
Jakkapan Praisuwan